The 2013 Puerto Rico teachers protest is an ongoing protest staged by the teachers of Puerto Rico's public school system which began on December 19, 2013. During the protest, teachers from the Puerto Rico Teachers Federation took over the floor of the Senate of Puerto Rico with the intention of halting an extraordinary session called by Governor Alejandro García Padilla. Padilla was going  to order a reform of the Puerto Rico Teachers Pension System. The Sergeant-at-Arms of the Senate of Puerto Rico stated he could not guarantee the safety of those in the hemicycle of the Capitol of Puerto Rico that houses the Senate. Both the Governor and the President of the Senate of Puerto Rico, Eduardo Bhatia, asked the Puerto Rico Joint Forces of Rapid Action (FURA) and the Puerto Rico Police to not intervene nor attempt to remove the protesters.

References

2013 in Puerto Rico
Puerto Rico
Senate of Puerto Rico